This is a list of the mammal species recorded in Heard Island and McDonald Islands. There are 13 mammal species in Heard Island and McDonald Islands, of which none are thought to be at risk.

The following tags are used to highlight each species' conservation status as assessed by the International Union for Conservation of Nature:

Order: Cetacea (whales) 

The order Cetacea includes whales, dolphins and porpoises. They are the mammals most fully adapted to aquatic life with a spindle-shaped nearly hairless body, protected by a thick layer of blubber, and forelimbs and tail modified to provide propulsion underwater.

Suborder: Odontoceti
Superfamily: Platanistoidea
Family: Phocoenidae
Genus: Phocoena
 Spectacled porpoise, Phocoena dioptrica DD
Family: Ziphidae
Genus: Berardius
 Giant beaked whale, Berardius arnuxii LR/cd
Subfamily: Hyperoodontinae
Genus: Mesoplodon
 Gray's beaked whale, Mesoplodon grayi DD
 Layard's beaked whale, Mesoplodon layardii DD
Family: Delphinidae (marine dolphins)
Genus: Orcinus
 Orca, Orcinus orca LR/cd
Genus: Globicephala
 Pilot whale, Globicephala melas LR/lc

Order: Carnivora (carnivorans) 

There are over 260 species of carnivorans, the majority of which feed primarily on meat. They have a characteristic skull shape and dentition. 
Suborder: Caniformia
Family: Otariidae (eared seals, sealions)
Genus: Arctophoca
 Antarctic fur seal, Arctophoca gazella LR/lc
 Subantarctic fur seal, Arctophoca tropicalis LR/lc
Family: Phocidae (earless seals)
Genus: Hydrurga
 Leopard seal, H. leptonyx LC
Genus: Leptonychotes
 Weddell seal, Leptonychotes weddellii LR/lc
Genus: Lobodon
 Crabeater seal, Lobodon carcinophagus LR/lc
Genus: Mirounga
 Southern elephant seal, Mirounga leonina LR/lc
Genus: Ommatophoca
 Ross seal, Ommatophoca rossii LR/lc

See also
Antarctic realm
Fauna of Heard Island and McDonald Islands
List of chordate orders
Lists of mammals by region
List of prehistoric mammals
Mammal classification
List of mammals described in the 2000s

Notes

References
 

 
Heard Island and McDonald Islands
Heard